The 26th Golden Globe Awards, honoring the best in film and television for 1968, were held on February 24, 1969.

Winners and nominees

Film

{| class="wikitable" style="width=100%"
! colspan="2" |Best Motion Picture
|-
! style="width=50%" |Drama
! style="width=50%" |Comedy or Musical
|-
| valign="top" |
The Lion in Winter
Charly
The Fixer
The Heart Is a Lonely Hunter
The Shoes of the Fisherman
| valign="top" |
Oliver!
Finian's Rainbow
Funny Girl
The Odd Couple
Yours, Mine and Ours
|-
! colspan="2" |Best Performance in a Motion Picture – Drama
|-
!Actor
!Actress
|-
| valign="top" |
Peter O'Toole - The Lion in Winter as King Henry II
Alan Arkin - The Heart Is a Lonely Hunter as John Singer
Alan Bates - The Fixer as Yakov Bok
Tony Curtis - The Boston Strangler as Albert DeSalvo
Cliff Robertson - Charly as Charlie Gordon
| valign="top" |
Joanne Woodward - Rachel, Rachel as Rachel Cameron
Mia Farrow - Rosemary's Baby as Rosemary Woodhouse
Katharine Hepburn - The Lion in Winter as Queen Eleanor of Aquitaine
Vanessa Redgrave - Isadora as Isadora Duncan
Beryl Reid - The Killing of Sister George as June "George" Buckridge
|-
! colspan="2" |Best Performance in a Motion Picture – Comedy or Musical
|-
!Actor
!Actress
|-
| valign="top" |
Ron Moody - Oliver! as Fagin
Fred Astaire - Finian's Rainbow as Finian McLonergan
Jack Lemmon - The Odd Couple as Felix Ungar
Walter Matthau - The Odd Couple as Oscar Madison
Zero Mostel - The Producers as Max Bialystock
| valign="top" |
Barbra Streisand - Funny Girl as Fanny Brice
Julie Andrews - Star! as Gertrude Lawrence
Lucille Ball - Yours, Mine and Ours as Helen North
Petula Clark - Finian's Rainbow as Sharon McLongeran
Gina Lollobrigida - Buona Sera, Mrs. Campbell as Carla Campbell
|-
! colspan="2" |Best Supporting Performance in a Motion Picture – Drama, Comedy or Musical
|-
!Supporting Actor
!Supporting Actress
|-
| valign="top" |
Daniel Massey - Star! as Noël Coward
Beau Bridges - For Love of Ivy as Tim Austin
Ossie Davis - The Scalphunters as Joseph Lee
Hugh Griffith - Oliver! as the Magistrate
Martin Sheen - The Subject Was Roses as Timmy Cleary
| valign="top" |
Ruth Gordon - Rosemary's Baby as Minnie Castevet
Barbara Hancock - Finian's Rainbow as Susan the Silent
Abbey Lincoln - For Love of Ivy as Ivy Moore
Sondra Locke - The Heart Is a Lonely Hunter as Mick Kelly
Jane Merrow - The Lion in Winter as Alais
|-
! colspan=2 | Other
|-
!Best Director
!Best Screenplay
|-
| valign="top" |
Paul Newman - Rachel, Rachel
Anthony Harvey - The Lion in Winter
Carol Reed - Oliver!
William Wyler - Funny Girl
Franco Zeffirelli - Romeo and Juliet
| valign="top" |
Charly - Stirling SilliphantThe Fixer - Dalton Trumbo
The Lion in Winter - James Goldman
The Producers - Mel Brooks
Rosemary's Baby - Roman Polanski
|-
!Best Original Score
!Best Original Song
|-
| valign="top" |The Shoes of the Fisherman - Alex NorthChitty Chitty Bang Bang - Sherman Brothers
The Lion in Winter - John Barry
Oliver! - Lionel Bart (declared ineligible and removed from ballot.)
Romeo and Juliet - Nino Rota
Rosemary's Baby - Krzysztof Komeda
The Thomas Crown Affair - Michel Legrand
| valign="top" |"The Windmills of Your Mind" (Alan and Marilyn Bergman, Michel Legrand) - The Thomas Crown Affair
"Buona Sera, Mrs. Campbell" (Riz Ortolani, Melvin Frank) - Buona Sera, Mrs. Campbell
"Chitty Chitty Bang Bang" (Sherman Brothers) - Chitty Chitty Bang Bang
"Funny Girl" (Jule Styne, Bob Merrill) - Funny Girl
"Star" (Michel Legrand, Jimmy Van Heusen, Sammy Cahn) - Star!
|-
!Best Foreign Film (English Language)
!Best Foreign Film (Foreign Language)
|-
| valign="top" |
Romeo and Juliet (Italy/United Kingdom)Benjamin (France)
Buona Sera, Mrs. Campbell (United Kingdom)
Joanna (United Kingdom)
Poor Cow (United Kingdom)
| valign="top" |War and Peace (USSR)The Bride Wore Black (France)
I Even Met Happy Gypsies (Yugoslavia)
Shame (Sweden)
Stolen Kisses (France)
|-
!New Star of the Year – Actor
!New Star of the Year – Actress
|-
| valign="top" |Leonard Whiting - Romeo and Juliet as Romeo MontagueAlan Alda - Paper Lion as George Plimpton
Daniel Massey - Star! as Noël Coward
Michael Sarrazin - The Sweet Ride as Denny McGuire
Jack Wild - Oliver! as Artful Dodger
| valign="top" |Olivia Hussey - Romeo and Juliet as Juliet CapuletEwa Aulin - Candy as Candy
Jacqueline Bisset - The Sweet Ride as Vickie Cartwright
Barbara Hancock - Finian's Rainbow as Susan the Silent
Sondra Locke - The Heart Is a Lonely Hunter as Mick Kelly
|}

Other: Cecil B. DeMille Award Gregory PeckTelevision

Best TV Show Rowan & Martin's Laugh-In
The Carol Burnett Show
The Doris Day Show
Julia
The Name of the Game

Best TV Star - Male
 Carl Betz - Judd for the Defense
Raymond Burr - Ironside
Peter Graves - Mission: Impossible
Dean Martin - The Dean Martin Show
Efrem Zimbalist, Jr. - The F.B.I.

Best TV Star - Female
 Diahann Carroll - Julia
Doris Day - The Doris Day Show
Hope Lange - The Ghost & Mrs. Muir
Elizabeth Montgomery - Bewitched
Nancy Sinatra - The Nancy Sinatra Show

References

External links
IMdb 1969 Golden Globe Awards

026
1968 film awards
1968 television awards
February 1969 events in the United States
1968 awards in the United States